Riiser-Larsen may refer to:
 Hjalmar Riiser-Larsen
 Riiser-Larsen Ice Shelf
 Riiser-Larsen Peninsula
 Riiser-Larsen Sea
 Mount Riiser-Larsen